Oliver Zapel (born 15 January 1968) is a German former footballer and manager, who is the manager of Phönix Lübeck.

Career
On 1 July 2016, Zapel became head coach of Sonnenhof Großaspach but resigned just a year later. He was appointed as the head coach of Werder Bremen II on 13 November 2017. He was sacked on 5 February 2018. On 22 April 2019, he was named the head coach of Fortuna Köln. In 2019, he moved back to Großaspach. He was sacked on 16 December 2019.

In January 2022 he returned to management as the manager of Phönix Lübeck.

Personal life
Zapel is married and has two children. He lives in Brunstorf near Hamburg.

References

External links
 
 

1968 births
Living people
People from Georgsmarienhütte
German footballers
Footballers from Lower Saxony
Association football midfielders
USC Paloma players
German football managers
3. Liga managers
SG Sonnenhof Großaspach managers
SV Werder Bremen II managers
SC Fortuna Köln managers